Asio is a genus of owls.

Asio or ASIO may also refer to:

asio C++ library, a programming library for asynchronous I/O
Audio Stream Input/Output, computer sound card driver protocol for low-latency digital audio
Australian Security Intelligence Organisation
"ASIO", a song by Redgum from Frontline
"ASIO" a song by Benny Cristo

See also
 AZO (disambiguation)
 ACO (disambiguation)